Alexander Stewart of Darnley may refer to:

 Alexander Stewart of Darnley (d.1374), Scottish nobleman
 Alexander Stewart of Darnley (d.1404), Scottish nobleman

See also
Alexander Stewart (disambiguation)